The Umgeni was a sailing ship of the Rennie line. She was launched in 1864 and served as a passenger ship transporting colonists to Natal before being converted to a coal carrier. In 1876 she ran aground near Glenelg in South Australia but was re-floated.

See also
 Umgeni River, Natal

References

Further reading
"Rennie's Steamer Service: Natal and Cape Colonies" by R. N. Porter, The South African Philatelist, Vol. 90, No. 6 (December 2014), Whole No. 927, pp. 178–182.
 Ingpen, B. &  Ingrid Staude-Griesel (Ed.) (2000) Horizons: The Story of Rennies, 1849-1999. Johannesburg: Rennies Management Services. 

1864 ships